Dorothea Lambert Chambers defeated Edith Johnson 6–4, 6–2 in the All Comers' Final, and then defeated the reigning champion Dora Boothby 6–2, 6–2 in the challenge round to win the ladies' singles tennis title at the 1910 Wimbledon Championships.

Draw

Challenge round

Finals

Top half

Section 1

Section 2

Bottom half

Section 3

Section 4

References

External links

Women's Singles
Wimbledon Championship by year – Women's singles
Wimbledon Championships - Singles
Wimbledon Championships - Singles